Wood Mountain was a federal electoral district in Saskatchewan, Canada, that was represented in the House of Commons of Canada from 1935 to 1949.

This riding was created in 1933 from parts of Willow Bunch riding. It was abolished in 1947 when it was redistributed into Assiniboia, Maple Creek and Swift Current ridings.

Election results

See also 

 List of Canadian federal electoral districts
 Past Canadian electoral districts

References 

Former federal electoral districts of Saskatchewan